"Sento solo il presente" is a song by Italian singer Annalisa. It was written by Kekko Silvestre by Modà and produced by Silvestre and Enrico Palmosi.

It was released by Warner Music Italy on 5 May 2014 as the lead single of her fourth studio album Splende. The song peaked at number 7 on the FIMI Singles Chart and was certified gold in Italy.

Music video
A music video to accompany the release of "Sento solo il presente" was released onto YouTube on 16 May 2014. It was directed by Gaetano Morbioli and shot in the Sigurtà Garden Park in Valeggio sul Mincio, Veneto.

Track listing

Charts

Certifications

References

2014 singles
2014 songs
Annalisa songs